The 1999 Evert Cup doubles was the doubles event of the eleventh edition of the tennis tournament played at Indian Wells, California, United States. It was the second WTA Tier I tournament of the year, and part of the US Spring tennis season. Lindsay Davenport and Natasha Zvereva were the defending champions but lost in the quarterfinals to Serena Williams and Venus Williams.

Martina Hingis and Anna Kournikova won in the final 6–2, 6–2 against Mary Joe Fernández and Jana Novotná.

Seeds
The top four seeded teams received byes into the second round.

Draw

Finals

Top half

Bottom half

Qualifying

Seeds

Qualifiers
  Kristie Boogert /  Anne-Gaëlle Sidot

Qualifying draw

External links
 1999 Evert Cup Doubles Draw

Evert Cup
1999 Newsweek Champions Cup and the Evert Cup